Anderson may refer to:

Companies 
 Anderson (Carriage), a company that manufactured automobiles from 1907 to 1910
 Anderson Electric, an early 20th-century electric car
 Anderson Greenwood, an industrial manufacturer
 Anderson Racing Karts, a manufacturer of Superkart racing chassis
 O.P. Anderson, a brand of aquavit vodka

People and fictional characters
 Anderson (surname), including a list of people and fictional characters
 Anderson (given name)
 Clan Anderson, a Scottish clan

 Anderson (footballer, born 1972)
 Anderson (footballer, born 1978)
 Anderson (footballer, born 1980)
 Anderson (footballer, born 1981) (Andrade Santos Silva), defender
 Anderson (footballer, born 1982)
 Anderson (footballer, born March 1983)
 Anderson (footballer, born April 1983)
 Anderson (footballer, born November 1983)
 Anderson (footballer, born 1985)
 Anderson (footballer, born 1988) (Anderson Luís de Abreu Oliveira), midfielder
 Anderson (footballer, born 1992)
 Anderson (footballer, born 1995) (Anderson de Jesus Santos), defender
 Anderson (footballer, born 1997)
 Anderson (footballer, born March 1998) (Anderson Silva da Paixão), goalkeeper
 Anderson (footballer, born October 1998) (Anderson Cordeiro Costa), winger

Places

Antarctica 
 Anderson Dome, a prominent ice-covered mountain in Ellsworth Land

Australia 
 Anderson, Victoria
 Anderson Inlet, Victoria
 Anderson Island (Tasmania)

Canada 
 Anderson, Perth County, Ontario
 Anderson Bay, British Columbia
 Anderson Lake (British Columbia)
 Anderson River (British Columbia)
 Anderson Settlement, New Brunswick
 Anderson River (Northwest Territories)

United Kingdom 
 Anderson, Dorset, a village and civil parish

United States 
 Anderson, Etowah County, Alabama, an unincorporated community
 Anderson, Alabama, a town
 Anderson, Alaska, a city
 Anderson, Arkansas, an unincorporated community
 Anderson, California, a city
 Anderson, Cass County, Illinois, an unincorporated community
 Anderson, Macoupin County, Illinois, an unincorporated community
 Anderson, Indiana, a city
 Anderson, Iowa, an unincorporated community
 Anderson, Kansas, a ghost town
 Anderson, Putnam Township, Michigan, an unincorporated community
 Anderson, Missouri, a city
 Anderson, New Jersey, a census-designated place
 Anderson, Ohio, an unincorporated community
 Anderson, South Carolina, a city
 Anderson, South Dakota, an unincorporated community
 Anderson, Texas, a city
 Anderson, Burnett County, Wisconsin, a town
 Anderson, Iron County, Wisconsin, a town
 Anderson, Rock County, Wisconsin, an unincorporated community
 Anderson Mesa, Arizona, south of Flagstaff
 Anderson River (Indiana)
 Anderson Valley, Mendocino County, California

Space 
 Anderson (crater), a lunar crater

Other places
 Anderson Barn (disambiguation)
 Anderson Bridge (disambiguation)
 Anderson County (disambiguation)
 Anderson Farm (disambiguation)
 Anderson House (disambiguation)
 Anderson Island (disambiguation)
 Anderson Lake (disambiguation)
 Anderson Manor (disambiguation)
 Anderson Manor (disambiguation)
 Anderson Peak (disambiguation)
 Anderson Road (disambiguation)
 Anderson Township (disambiguation)
 Fort Anderson (disambiguation)

Schools 
 Anderson University (Indiana), Anderson, Indiana
 Anderson University (South Carolina), Anderson, South Carolina
 UCLA Anderson School of Management, Los Angeles, California
 Anderson High School (disambiguation)
 The Anderson School PS 334, New York, New York

Titles 
 Lord Anderson (disambiguation), peerages created in the UK
 Earl of Yarborough, a British peerage
 Anderson baronets, nine baronetcies, all extinct

Transport

Railroad stations
 Anderson Avenue station, in Drexel Hill, Pennsylvania, US
 Anderson railway station (Victoria), a former railway station in Anderson, Victoria, Australia
 Anderson Regional Transportation Center, in Woburn, Massachusetts, US
 Anderson station (Calgary), a light rail station in Calgary, Alberta, Canada
 Anderson Street station, in Hackensack, New Jersey, US

Other uses in transport
 Anderson (automobile), an American car
 Anderson Field (Washington), a public airport in Brewster, Washington, US
 Anderson Field (Nevada), a former airport in Las Vegas, Nevada, US
 Anderson Municipal Airport, a public airport in Anderson, Indiana, US
 Anderson Regional Airport, a public airport in Anderson, South Carolina, US

Other uses 
 USS Anderson, a US Navy destroyer
 Anderson (mango), a type of mango originating in Miami, Florida
 Anderson Arena, a sports arena on the campus of Bowling Green State University, Ohio
 Anderson Live, formerly Anderson, an American syndicated talk show

See also
 Anderson shelter, an air raid shelter used in Britain during the Second World War
 Anderson turn, a ship or boat maneuver
 
 Andersons (disambiguation)
 Andersen (disambiguation)
 Andersson, a surname
 Andersson (crater), a lunar crater
 Anderssen